Futbol Club Santboià is a Spanish football team based in Sant Boi de Llobregat, in the autonomous community of Catalonia. Founded in 1908 it plays in Tercera División – Group 5, holding home matches at Estadi Municipal Joan Baptista Milà, with a capacity for 2,500 seats.

History 
The club was founded in 1908 as Foot-ball Club Samboyano. Its founders were Joan Baptista Milà, Francesc and Modest Amat, Mateu Puig, Boi Mestres, Jacint Ros, Mateu Parés, Enric Beltràn and the brothers Massana.

Season to season

1 season in Segunda División B
28 seasons in Tercera División

References

External links
Official website
Futbolme team profile 

 
Sant Boi de Llobregat
Football clubs in Catalonia
Association football clubs established in 1908
1908 establishments in Spain